What Becomes of the Children? (1918 film), a film directed by Walter Richard Stahl
What Becomes of the Children? (1936 film), a film directed by Walter Shumway